= Umbar Pada Nandade =

- city
- Location in Maharashtra, India
- Coordinates: 19.4667°N 73.0833°E
- Country: India
- State: Maharashtra
- District: Thane

Population (2001)
  - Total: 5,689

Languages
  - Official: Marathi
- Time zone: UTC+5:30 (IST)

Umbar Pada Nandade is a census town in Thane district in the Indian state of Maharashtra.

== Demographics ==
At the 2001 India census, Umbar Pada Nandade had a population of 5689. Males constituted 53% of the population and females 47%. Umbar Pada Nandade had an average literacy rate of 73%, higher than the national average of 59.5%: male literacy was 79% and female literacy is 67%. In Umbar Pada Nandade, 13% of the population were under 6 years of age.
